Lovis can be a given name and a surname:

Given name
 Lovis Corinth (1858-1925), German painter
  (1898-1976), German publisher, writer and journalist

Surname
 , Swiss astronomer
  (1817–1890), Swiss architect

See also
 Lovi (disambiguation)
 Lovisa (given name)